Václav Karabáček (born May 2, 1996) is a Czech professional ice hockey right wing who currently plays for Motor České Budějovice of the 1st Czech Republic Hockey League on loan from Mountfield HK of the Czech Extraliga (ELH). He was drafted in the second round, 49th overall, by the Buffalo Sabres in the 2014 NHL Entry Draft.

Karabáček played the first game of the 2014 NHL preseason with the Sabres before being sent back to the QMJHL. After playing one preseason game for the team in the 2015 NHL preseason as well, he was again sent back to juniors.

Playing career
He began his North American career with the Gatineau Olympiques of the QMJHL in 2013-14 season before being traded to Baie-Comeau during the 2014-15 season in exchange for Valentin Zykov. Prior to that trade, the Olympiques had made a deal with the Charlottetown Islanders to send Karabáček there in advance of the 2014 QMJHL Entry Draft; however, complications surrounding that proposal ultimately led to Karabáček staying with Gatineau.

Karabáček was expected to represent the Czech Republic at the 2015 World Junior Ice Hockey Championships, but he was cut from the team prior to the tournament for arriving late to a team meeting.  
 
Karabáček was also selected with the 36th pick of the 2013 KHL Junior Draft by KHL Medveščak Zagreb. On May 26, 2016, Karabáček marked the end of his junior career after he was signed to a three-year entry-level contract with the Buffalo Sabres. He made his professional debut in November 2016 playing for the Elmira Jackals of the ECHL. He was named a 2017 ECHL All-Star alternate after scoring 11 points in nine games with the team.

Karabáček was recalled by the Rochester Americans on December 14, 2016. He began the 2017-18 season with the Americans, but was sent down to the ECHL's Cincinnati Cyclones in November.

Karabáček scored no goals and had only five assists in 28 games with the Cyclones, and the Sabres bought out his contract on September 20, 2018.

Karabáček signed with HC Kometa Brno of the Czech Extraliga for the 2018–19 season on September 24, 2018. He went scoreless in 4 games with Brno before leaving the club for rivals Mountfield HK on October 27, 2018.

Career statistics

Regular season and playoffs

International

References

External links

1996 births
Living people
Baie-Comeau Drakkar players
Buffalo Sabres draft picks
Motor České Budějovice players
Cincinnati Cyclones (ECHL) players
Czech ice hockey right wingers
Elmira Jackals (ECHL) players
Gatineau Olympiques players
HC Kometa Brno players
Moncton Wildcats players
Stadion Hradec Králové players
Rochester Americans players
Ice hockey people from Prague
Czech expatriate sportspeople in Austria
Expatriate ice hockey players in Austria
Czech expatriate ice hockey players in Canada
Czech expatriate ice hockey players in the United States